Vida Nsiah (born 13 April 1976) is a retired female track and field sprinter and hurdler from Ghana. At the 1998 Commonwealth Games in Kuala Lumpur she finished fifth in the 100 metres and sixth in the 200 metres.

Together with Mavis Akoto, Monica Twum and Vida Anim she holds the Ghanaian record in 4 x 100 metres relay with 43.19 seconds, achieved during the heats at the 2000 Summer Olympics in Sydney.

Personal bests
100 metres - 11.18 s (2000) - former national record.
200 metres - 22.80 s (1997) - national record. 
100 metres hurdles - 13.02 s (2001) - national record.

References

External links

sports-reference

1976 births
Living people
Ghanaian female sprinters
Ghanaian female hurdlers
Athletes (track and field) at the 1996 Summer Olympics
Athletes (track and field) at the 2000 Summer Olympics
Olympic athletes of Ghana
Athletes (track and field) at the 1994 Commonwealth Games
Athletes (track and field) at the 1998 Commonwealth Games
Commonwealth Games competitors for Ghana